Nudity is the state of being in which a human is without clothing. 

The loss of body hair was one of the physical characteristics that marked the biological evolution of modern humans from their hominin ancestors. Adaptations related to hairlessness contributed to the increase in brain size, bipedalism, and the variation in human skin color. While estimates vary, for at least 90,000 years anatomically modern humans were naked. The invention of clothing was part of the transition to being not only anatomically but behaviorally modern. 

With the rise of civilizations, clothing became part of non-verbal communications, indicating a person's social status and individuality, thus the lack of clothing could be a sign of low status. However, through much of history until the late modern period, people might be unclothed by necessity or convenience when engaged in labor and athletics; or when bathing or swimming. Such functional nudity occurred in groups that were usually but not always segregated by sex.

In ancient religions, deities were often depicted as perfect naked humans. Indigenous peoples in tropical climates used clothing for decorative or ceremonial purposes but were often nude, having neither the need to protect the body from the elements nor any concept of sexual shame. The association between nudity and shame is unique to followers of Abrahamic religions. The spread of Western concepts of modest dress was part of colonialism.  

Social norms regarding nudity vary widely, reflecting cultural ambiguity towards the body and sexuality, and differing conceptions of what constitutes public versus private spaces. Norms relating to nudity are different for men than they are for women. In many societies, both ancient and contemporary, children might be naked until the beginning of puberty. Individuals may intentionally violate norms relating to nudity; those without power may use nudity as a form of protest, and those with power may impose nakedness on others as a form of punishment.

While the majority of societies require clothing in most situations, others recognize non-sexual nudity as being appropriate for some recreational, social or celebratory activities, and appreciate nudity in the arts as representing positive values. Societies such as Japan and Finland maintain traditions of communal nudity based upon the use of baths and saunas that provided alternatives to sexualization. Some societies and groups continue to disapprove of nudity not only in public but also in private based upon religious beliefs. Norms are codified to varying degrees by laws defining proper dress and indecent exposure.

Terminology 
In general English usage, nude and naked are often synonyms for a human being unclothed, but take on many meanings in particular contexts. Nude derives from Norman French, while naked is from the Anglo-Saxon. To be naked is more straightforward, not being properly dressed, or if stark naked, entirely without clothes. Nudity has more social connotations, and particularly in the fine arts, positive associations with the beauty of the human body.

Further synonyms and euphemisms for nudity abound, including "birthday suit", "in the altogether" and "in the buff". Partial nudity may be defined as not covering the genitals or other parts of the body deemed sexual, such as the buttocks or female breasts.

Origins of nakedness and clothing

Two human evolutionary processes are significant regarding nudity; first the biological evolution of early hominids from being covered in fur to being effectively hairless, followed by the cultural evolution of adornments and clothing. In the past there have been several theories regarding why humans lost their fur, but the need to dissipate body heat remains the most widely accepted evolutionary explanation. Less hair, and an increase in eccrine sweating, made it easier for early humans to cool their bodies when they moved from living in shady forest to open savanna. The ability to dissipate excess body heat helped make possible the dramatic enlargement of the brain, the most temperature-sensitive human organ.

Some of the technology for what is now called clothing may have originated to make other types of adornment, including jewelry, body paint, tattoos, and other body modifications, "dressing" the naked body without concealing it. According to Leary and Buttermore, body adornment is one of the changes that occurred in the late Paleolithic (40,000 to 60,000 years ago) in which humans became not only anatomically modern, but also behaviorally modern and capable of self-reflection and symbolic interaction. More recent studies place the use of adornment at 77,000 years ago in South Africa, and 90,000—100,000 years ago in Israel and Algeria. While modesty is a factor, often overlooked purposes for body coverings are camouflage used by hunters, body armor, and costumes used to impersonate "spirit-beings".

The current empirical evidence for the origin of clothing is from a 2010 study published in Molecular Biology and Evolution. That study indicates that the habitual wearing of clothing began at some point in time between 170,000 and 83,000 years ago based upon a genetic analysis indicating when clothing lice diverged from their head louse ancestors. A 2017 study published in Science estimated that anatomically modern humans evolved 350,000 to 260,000 years ago. Thus, humans were naked in prehistory for at least 90,000 years.

The use of clothing is one of the changes that mark the end of the Neolithic and the beginning of civilization, between 7 and 9 thousand years ago. Much of what is known about the early history of clothing is from depictions of the higher classes, there being few surviving artifacts. Everyday behaviors are rarely represented in historical records. Clothing and adornment became part of the symbolic communication that marked a person's membership in their society, thus nakedness meant being at the bottom of the social scale, lacking in dignity and status. In each culture, ornamentation represented the wearer's place in society; position of authority, economic class, gender role, and marital status. From the beginning of civilization, there was ambiguity regarding everyday nakedness and the nudity in depictions of deities and heroes indicating positive meanings of the unclothed body. The social humiliation of nakedness was not associated with sin or shame regarding sexuality, which was unique to Judeo-Christian societies.

Ancient and classical history

For millennia from Mesopotamia to the Middle Kingdom of Egypt the majority of men and women wore a cloth wrapped or tied to cover the lower part of the body. Both men and women would be bare-chested and barefoot. Complete nakedness was embarrassing due to the social connotations of low status and deprivation rather than shame regarding sexuality. Slaves might not be provided with clothing. Other workers would be naked while performing many tasks, particularly if hot, dirty, or wet; farmers, fishermen, herders, and those working close to fires or ovens. Only the upper classes were habitually dressed. It was not until the later periods, in particular the New Kingdom of Egypt (1550–1069 BCE), that functionaries in the households of the wealthy began wearing refined dress, and upper-class women wore elaborate dresses and ornamentation which covered their breasts. These later styles are often shown in film and TV as representing Ancient Egypt in all periods.

Male nudity was celebrated in ancient Greece to a greater degree than any culture before or since. The status of freedom, maleness, privilege, and physical virtues were asserted by discarding everyday clothing for athletic nudity. Nudity became a ritual costume by association of the naked body with the beauty and power of the gods who were depicted as perfect naked humans. In Etruscan and early Roman athletics, in which masculinity involved prudishness and paranoia about effeminacy, the Greek traditions were not maintained because public nudity became associated with homoeroticism. In the Roman Empire (27 BCE –  476 CE), the status of the upper classes was such that nudity was of no concern for men, and for women only if seen by their social superiors. At the Roman baths (thermae), which had social functions similar to a modern beach, mixed nude bathing may have been the norm up to the fourth century CE.

Colonialism and racism

The Age of Western Colonialism was marked by more frequent encounters between Christian and Muslim cultures and Indigenous peoples of the tropics, leading to the stereotypes of the "naked savage". In his diaries, Christopher Columbus writes that the natives of Guanahani were entirely naked, both men and women, and gentle. This also meant that they were seen as less than fully human, and exploitable. Initially Islam exerted little influence beyond large towns, outside of which pagan norms continued. In travels in Mali in the 1350s, Muslim scholar Ibn Battuta was shocked by the casual relationships between men and women even at the court of Sultans, and the public nudity of female slaves and servants.

Non-western cultures during the period were naked only by comparison to Western norms. The genitals or entire lower body of adults were covered by garments in most situations, while the upper body of both men and women might be unclothed. However, lacking the western concept of shame regarding the body, such garments might be removed in public for practical or ceremonial purposes. Children until puberty and sometimes women until marriage might be naked as having "nothing to hide".

Indigenous peoples of the Americas similarly had no associations of sexuality or nudity with shame or sin. European colonizers became aware of other practices, including premarital and extramarital sex, homosexuality, and cross-dressing, that motivated their efforts to convert Natives to Christianity. However, characterization of others as savage may have been to justify conquest and displacement. The Aztec city Tenochtitlán reached a population of eighty thousand before the arrival of the Spanish in 1520. Built on an island in Lake Texcoco, it was dependent upon hydraulic engineering for agriculture which also supplied bathing facilities with both steam baths (temazcales) and tubs. The conquistadors viewed indigenous bathing practices, which included both men and women entering temazcales naked, in terms of paganism and sexual immorality and sought to eradicate them. In the Yucatan, Mayan men and women bathed in rivers with little concern for modesty. Yet in spite of the number of hot springs in the region, there is no mention of their use for bathing by indigenous peoples. 
 
From the 17th century, European explorers viewed the lack of clothing they encountered in Africa and Oceania as representative of a primitive state of nature, justifying their own superiority, even as they continued to admire the nudity of Greek statues. A distinction was made by colonizers between idealized nudity in art and the nakedness of Indigenous people, which was uncivilized and indicative of racial inferiority.

Depictions of naked savages entered European popular culture in the 18th century in popular stories of tropical islands. In particular, Europeans became fascinated by the image of the Pacific island woman with bare breasts. While much was made of Polynesian nakedness, European cloth was welcomed as part of traditions of wrapping the body. Into the 20th century, the people of Pukapuka continued to be naked until adulthood.

Dressing Africans in European clothes to cover their nakedness was part of converting them to Christianity. In the 19th century, photographs of naked Indigenous peoples began circulating in Europe without a clear distinction between those created as commercial curiosities (or erotica) and those claiming to be scientific, or ethnographic images. Given the state of photography, it is unclear which images were posed, rather than being representative of everyday attire. George Basden, a missionary and ethnographer who lived with the Igbo people of Nigeria published two volumes of photographs in the 1920s and 1930s. The book described images of unclothed but elaborately decorated Igbo women as indicating their high status as eligible brides who would not have thought of themselves as naked.

In the early 20th century, tropical countries became tourist destinations. A German tourist guide for Bali beginning in the 1920s added to the promotion of the island as an "Eden" for Western visitors by describing the beauty of Balinese women, who were bare-breasted in everyday life and unclothed while bathing in the ocean. Soon however, the Dutch colonial administration began issuing conflicting orders regarding proper dress, which had limited effect due to some Balinese supporting tradition, others modernization.

Cultural differences
Norms related to nudity are associated with norms regarding personal freedom, human sexuality, and gender roles, which vary widely among contemporary societies. Situations where private or public nudity is accepted vary. Some people practice social nudity within the confines of semi-private facilities such as naturist resorts, while other seek more open acceptance of nudity in everyday life and in public spaces designated as clothing-optional.

All hunter-gatherer societies from prehistory to the present have something in common in addition to their lifestyle: they are naked. The Europeans who first contacted tropical peoples reported that they were unashamedly naked, only occasionally wrapping themselves in capes in colder weather. Many pastoral societies in warmer climates are also minimally clothed or naked while working. This practice continued when western clothing was first introduced; for example Aboriginal Australians in 1819 wore only the jackets they were given, but not pants. The encounter between the Indigenous cultures of Africa, the Americas and Oceania with Europeans had a significant effect on both cultures. Western ambivalence could be expressed by responding to the nakedness of natives as either a sign of rampant sexuality or of the innocence that preceded the Fall.

Sexual and non-sexual nudity

The social context defines the cultural meaning of nudity that may range from the sacred to the profane. There are activities where freedom of movement is promoted by full or partial nudity. The nudity of the ancient Olympics was part of a religious practice. Athletic activities are also appreciated for the beauty of bodies in motion (as in dance), but in the post-modern media athletic bodies are often taken out of context to become purely sexual, perhaps pornographic.

The sexual nature of nudity is defined by the gaze of others. Studies of naturism find that its practitioners adopt behaviors and norms that suppress the sexual responses while practicing social nudity. Such norms include refraining from staring, touching, or otherwise calling attention to the body while naked. However, some naturists do not maintain this non-sexual atmosphere, as when nudist resorts host sexually-oriented events.

Africa
There is a sharp contrast between Islamic countries where nudity is forbidden and the sub-Saharan countries that never abandoned, or are reasserting, precolonial norms that accepted nudity as natural. In contemporary rural villages, both boys and girls are allowed to play totally nude, and women bare their breasts in the belief that the meaning of naked bodies is not limited to sexuality. Full or partial nudity is observed among some Burkinabese and Nilo-Saharan (e.g. Nuba and Surma people)—during particular occasions; for example, stick-fighting tournaments in Ethiopia. Adults of the Anang Ibibio do not associate nudity with shame, but remove their minimal clothing to bathe together. In Lagos, Nigeria, some parents continue to allow children to be naked until puberty. There is now an issue with strangers taking photographs, and they worry about pedophiles, but want kids to grow up with a positive body image and have the same freedom they remember from their own childhood.

The revival of pre-colonial culture is asserted in the adoption of traditional dress—young women wearing only beaded skirts and jewelry—in the Umkhosi Womhlanga (Reed Dance) by the Zulu and Swazi. However, the authenticity and propriety of the paid performance of "bare chested" Zulu girls for international tourists is sometimes questioned. Other examples of ethnic tourism reflect the visitor's desire to experience what they imagine being an exotic culture, which includes nudity.

With the independence of Ghana from English rule in 1957, the first Prime Minister Kwame Nkrumah and his political party began a program that sought to eliminate undesirable practices including female genital mutilation, human trafficking, prostitution, and nudity. Nudity was practiced by the Frafra, Dagarti, Kokomba, Builsa, Kassena and Lobi peoples in the Northern and Upper Regions of the country. Although the stated opposition to nudity was its association with harmful practices, its prevalence as a tradition was seen as detrimental to Ghana's reputation in the world and economic development, nakedness being associated with primitive backwardness. However anti-nudity efforts also promoted the equal status of women. Some traditional practices remain, the Sefwi people of Ghana performing a ritual, "Be Me Truo" that includes dancing, singing and drama by nude women to avert disaster and promote fertility.

Asia
In Asian countries, rather than being immoral or shameful, nakedness is perceived as a breach of etiquette and loss of "face". In contemporary China, while maintaining the traditions of modest dress in everyday life, the use of nudity in magazine advertising indicates the effect of globalization. In much of Asia, traditional dress covers the entire body, similar to Western dress. In stories written in China as early as the fourth century BCE, nudity is presented as an affront to human dignity, reflecting the belief that "humanness" in Chinese society is not innate, but is earned by correct behavior. However, nakedness could also be used by an individual to express contempt for others in their presence. In other stories, the nudity of women, emanating the power of yin, could nullify the yang of aggressive forces.

The Tokugawa period in Japan (1603–1868) was defined by the social dominance of hereditary classes, with clothing a regulated marker of status and little nudity among the upper classes. However, working populations in both rural and urban areas often dressed only in loincloths, including women in hot weather and while nursing. Lacking baths in their homes, they also frequented public bathhouses where everyone was unclothed together. This communal nudity might extend to other activities in rural villages. With the opening of Japan to European visitors in the Meiji era (1868–1912), the previously normal states of undress, and the custom of mixed public bathing, became an issue for leaders concerned with Japan's international reputation. A law was established with fines for those that violated the ban on undress. Although often ignored or circumvented, the law had the effect of sexualizing the naked body in situations that had not previously been erotic. Public bathing for purification as well as cleanliness is part of both Shintoism and Buddhism in Japan. Purification in the bath is not only for the body, but the heart or spirit (kokoro)

In India, the conventions regarding proper dress do not apply to monks in some Hindu and Jain sects who reject clothing as worldly. Although overwhelmingly male, there have been female ascetics such as Akka Mahadevi who refused to wear clothing. In Bangladesh, the Mru people have resisted centuries of Muslim and Christian pressure to clothe their nakedness as part of religious conversion. Most retain their own religion, which includes elements of Buddhism and Animism, as well as traditional clothing: a loincloth for men and a skirt for women.

Oceania
Prior to the European colonization of New Zealand, Māori people went naked or nearly naked in casual settings as the climate allowed, although they did wear clothing to keep out the weather and denote social status. Men frequently wore nothing but a belt with a piece of string attached holding their foreskin shut over their glans penis. There was no shame or modesty attached to women's breasts, and therefore no garments devoted to concealing them; however, women did cover their pubic area in the presence of men, as exposing it was a cultural expression of anger and contempt. Pre-pubescent children wore no clothes at all. European colonists cited nudity as a sign of Māori racial inferiority, calling them "naked savages".

On the islands of Yap State, dances by women in traditional dress that does not cover the breasts are included in the Catholic celebration of Christmas and Easter.

South America

In Brazil, the Yawalapiti—an Indigenous Xingu tribe in the Amazon Basin—practice a funeral ritual known as Quarup to celebrate life, death and rebirth. The ritual involves the presentation of all young girls who have begun menstruating since the last Quarup and whose time has come to choose a partner. The Awá hunters, the male members of an Indigenous people of Brazil living in the eastern Amazon rainforest, are completely naked apart from a piece of string decorated with bird feathers tied to the end of their penises. This minimalist dress code reflects the spirit of the hunt and being overdressed may be considered ridiculous or inappropriate.

Western societies
The Western world inherited contradictory cultural traditions relating to nudity in various contexts. The first tradition came from the ancient Greeks, who saw the naked body as the natural state and as essentially positive. The second is based upon the Abrahamic religions—Judaism, Christianity, and Islam—which view being naked as shameful and essentially negative. The interaction between the Greek classical and later Abrahamic traditions has resulted in Western ambivalence, with nudity acquiring both positive and negative meanings in individual psychology, in social life, and in depictions such as art. The conservative versions of these religions continue to prohibit public and sometimes also private nudity. While public modesty prevails in more recent times, organized groups of nudists or naturists emerged with the stated purpose of regaining a natural connection to the human body and nature, sometimes in private spaces but also in public. Naturism in the United States, meanwhile, remains largely confined to private facilities, with few "clothing optional" public spaces compared to Europe. In spite of the liberalization of attitudes toward sex, Americans remain uncomfortable with complete nudity.

Moral ambiguity
The moral ambiguity of nudity is reflected in its many meanings, often expressed in the metaphors used to describe cultural values, both positive and negative.

One of the first—but now obsolete—meanings of nude in the 16th century was "mere, plain, open, explicit" as reflected in the modern metaphors "the naked truth" and "the bare facts". Naturists often speak of their nakedness in terms of a return to the innocence and simplicity of childhood. The term naturism is based upon the idea that nakedness is connected to nature positively as a form of egalitarianism, that all humans are alike in their nakedness. Nudity also represents freedom: the liberation of the body is associated with sexual liberation, although many naturists tend to downplay this connection. In some forms of group psychotherapy, nudity has been used to promote open interaction and communication. Religious persons who reject the world as it is including all possessions may practice nudism, or use nakedness as a protest against an unjust world.

Many of the negative associations are the inverse of positive ones. If nudity is truth, nakedness may be an invasion of privacy or the exposure of uncomfortable truths, a source of anxiety. The strong connection of nudity to sex produces shame when naked in contexts where sexuality is deemed inappropriate. Rather than being natural, nakedness is associated with savagery, poverty, criminality, and death. To be deprived of clothes is punishment, humiliating and degrading.

Confronted with this ambiguity, some individuals seek to resolve it by working toward greater acceptance of nudity for themselves and others. Those that adopt naturism later in life go through stages during which they gradually learn a new set of values regarding the human body. However, philosopher Krista Thomason notes that negative emotions including shame exist because they are functional, and that human beings are not perfect.

Abrahamic religions
The meaning of the naked body in Judaism, Christianity, and Islam is based upon the Genesis creation narrative, but each religion has their own interpretation. What is shared by all was various degrees of modest dress and the avoidance of nakedness.

The meaning of this myth is inconsistent with a philosophical analysis of shame as an emotion of reflective self-assessment which is understood as a response to being seen by others, a social context that did not exist. The response of Adam and Eve to cover their bodies indicates that upon gaining knowledge of good and evil, they became aware of nakedness as intrinsically shameful, which contradicts their intrinsic goodness "before the fall". According to German philosopher Thorsten Botz-Bornstein, interpretations of Genesis have placed responsibility for the fall of man and original sin on Eve, and, therefore, all women. As a result, the nudity of women is deemed more shameful personally and corrupting to society than the nakedness of men. The biblical stories of Bathsheba and Susanna place the responsibility for arousing lust in male onlookers upon the women who are bathing, although they had no intent to be seen. This is in contrast to the story of Judith, who bathes publicly to seduce and later behead the enemy general Holofernes. However all three stories are based upon the belief that men are unable to control their sexuality when seeing a nude woman.

Christianity
The meaning of nudity for early Christians was the baptism, which was originally by full immersion and without clothes in a basin attached to every cathedral. Both men and women were baptized naked, deaconesses performing the rite for women to maintain modesty. Until the fifth century CE, pagan nudity was associated with sex, Christian nudity with grace. Jesus was originally depicted nude as would have been the case in Roman crucifixions, but the Christian adoption of the pagan association of the body with sex prompted the clothing of Christ. Some clerics went further, to hatred and fear of the body, insisting that monks sleep fully dressed.

In the 13th century, Christian theologians dealt with the issue of sexuality, Albertus Magnus favoring a more philosophical view influenced by Aristotle that sex within marriage was a natural act. However, his pupal Thomas Aquinas and others took the view of Saint Augustine that sexual desire was shameful not only as a sin, but that lust was a disorder because it undermined reason. Sexual arousal was deemed so dangerous as to be avoided except for procreation, nudity being particularly taboo, which remained until the Renaissance.

Although there is a common misconception that Europeans did not bathe in the Middle Ages, public bath houses—usually segregated by sex—were popular until the 16th century, when concern for the spread of disease closed many of them. The Roman baths in Bath, Somerset, were rebuilt, and used by both sexes without garments until the 15th century.

In Christian Europe, the parts of the body that were required to be covered in public did not always include the female breasts. In depictions of the Madonna from the 14th century, Mary is shown with one bared breast, symbolic of nourishment and loving care. During a transitional period, there continued to be positive religious images of saints, but also depictions of Eve indicating shame. By 1750, artistic representations of the breast were either erotic or medical. This eroticization of the breast coincided with the persecution of women as witches.

The Christian association of nakedness with shame and anxiety became ambivalent during the Renaissance as a result of the rediscovered art and writings of Ancient Greece offering an alternative tradition of nudity as symbolic of innocence and purity which could be understood in terms of the state of man "before the fall". The meaning of nudity in Europe was also changed in the 1500s by reports of naked inhabitants of the Americas, and the African slaves brought to Italy by the Portuguese. Both slavery and colonialism were the beginning of the association of public nakedness with savagery.

Christian theology rarely addresses nudity, but rather proper dress and modesty. Western cultures adopted Greek heritage only with regard to art, the ideal nude. Real naked people remained shameful; and become human only when they cover their nakedness. In one of a series of lectures "Theology of the Body" given in 1979, Pope John Paul II said that the innocent nudity of being before the fall is regained only between loving spouses. In daily life,  Christianity requires clothing in public, but with great variation between and within societies as to the meaning of "public" and how much of the body is covered.
Finnish Lutherans practice mixed nudity in private saunas used by families and close-knit groups. While maintaining communal nudity, men and women are now often separated in public or community settings. Certain sects of Christianity through history have included nudity into worship practices, but these have been deemed heretical. There have been Christian naturists in the United States since the 1920s, but as a social and recreational practice rather than part of an organized religion.

Islam
The practice known as veiling of women in public predates Islam in Persia, Syria, and Anatolia. Islamic clothing for men covers the area from the waist to the knees.In the medieval period, Islamic norms became more patriarchal, and very concerned with the chastity of women before marriage and fidelity afterward. Women were not only veiled, but segregated from society, with no contact with men not of close kinship, the presence of whom defined the difference between public and private spaces.

Of particular concern for both Islam and early Christians, as they extended their control over countries that had previously been part of the Byzantine or Roman empires, was the local custom of public bathing. While Christians were mainly concerned about mixed-gender bathing, which had been common, Islam also prohibited nudity for women in the company of non-Muslim women. In general, the Roman bathing facilities were adapted for separation of the genders, and the bathers retaining at least a loin-cloth as in the Turkish bath of today.

Islamic countries are guided by rules of modesty that forbid nudity, with variations between five schools of Islamic law, the most conservative being the Hanbali School in Saudi Arabia and Qatar, where the niqab, the garment covering the whole female body and the face with a narrow opening for the eyes, is widespread. Hands are also hidden within sleeves as much as possible. The burqa, limited mainly to Afghanistan, also has a mesh screen which covers the eye opening. Different rules apply to men, women, and children; and depend upon the gender and family relationship of others present.

Sex and gender differences

Gender equality
Social acceptance of mixed gender nudity is associated with gender equality, which is highest in the Netherlands, Denmark, Norway, and Sweden. America and the Netherlands went through the same period of feminist activism in the 1960s-70s, but Dutch men were more open to the idea of gender equality, there being a prior history of regarding sexuality as healthy and normal. This trend has been promoted by the adoption of comprehensive sex education for all students beginning at age four.

Female nudity

In Western cultures, shame can result from not living up to the ideals of society with regard to physical appearance. Historically, such shame has affected women more than men. With regard to their naked bodies, the result is a tendency toward self-criticism by women, while men are less concerned by the evaluation of others. In patriarchal societies, which include much of the world, norms regarding proper attire and behavior are stricter for women than for men, and the judgements for violation of these norms are more severe. 

Contemporary high fashion in western cultures includes partial nudity for women as an expression of empowerment in contrast to the history of the women's subordination.

Breastfeeding 

Breastfeeding in public is forbidden in some jurisdictions, not regulated in others, and protected as a legal right in public and the workplace in still others. Where public breastfeeding is unregulated or legal, mothers may be reluctant to do so because other people may object. The issue of breastfeeding is part of the sexualization of the breast in many cultures, and the perception of threat in what others perceive as non-sexual. Pope Francis came out in support of public breastfeeding at church services soon after assuming the Papacy.

Topfreedom

In much of the world, the modesty of women is a matter not only of social custom but of the legal definition of indecent exposure. In the United States, the exposure of female nipples is a criminal offense in many states and is not usually allowed in public. Individual women who have contested indecency laws by baring their breasts in public assert that their behavior is not sexual. In Canada, the law was changed to include a definition of a sexual context in order for behavior to be indecent. The "topfreedom" movement in the United States promotes equal rights for women to be naked above the waist in public on the same basis that would apply to men in the same circumstances. The illegality of topfreedom is viewed as institutionalization of negative cultural values that affect women's body image. The law in New York State was challenged in 1986 by nine women who exposed their breasts in a public park, which led to nine years of litigation culminating with an opinion by the Court of Appeals that overturned the convictions on the basis of the women's actions not being lewd, rather than overturning the law as unconstitutional on the basis of equal protection, which is what the women sought. While the decision gave women more freedom to be top-free (e.g. while sunbathing), it did not give them equality with men. Other court decisions have given individuals the right to be briefly nude in public as a form of expression protected by the First Amendment, but not on a continuing basis for their own comfort or enjoyment as men are allowed to do. In 2020 the US Supreme Court refused to hear the appeal of three women after the New Hampshire Supreme Court found that the state law does not discriminate against women because it bans nudity, which has traditionally included female breasts.

Survey research was done in Australia, where women not covering their breasts is common on some public beaches, such as in Sydney. Of the 165 women surveyed, 116 had been topless. Women who had sunbathed topless responded that they experienced this behavior as pure and natural rather than sexual. They also had generally positive attitudes toward sexuality compared to those who had never been topfree. However, 76% of women who had not sunbathed topless said women had the right to do so.

Male nudity

Historically, men and boys had bathed and swam nude in secluded rivers and lakes. In England when sea bathing became popular in the 18th century, beaches were initially male only, but with the easier access of the 19th century, the mixing of genders became a problem. The addition of "bathing machines" at seaside resorts was not successful in maintaining standards of decency, men often continuing to be nude while women wore bathing costumes. However, public concern was only regarding adults, it being generally accepted that boys at English beaches would be nude. This prompted complaints by visiting Americans, but Englishmen had no objection to their daughters being fully dressed on the beach with naked boys.

In the United States and other Western countries for much of the 20th century, male nudity was the norm in gender segregated activities including summer camps, swimming pools and communal showers based on cultural beliefs that females need more privacy than males. Beginning in 1900, businessmen swam nude at private athletic clubs in New York City, which ended with a 1980 law requiring the admission of women.  For boys, this expectation might include public behavior as in 1909 when The New York Times reported that at an elementary school swim public competition the youngest boys competed in the nude.

Hygiene was given as the reason for official guidelines requiring male nudity in indoor pools, allowing suits only for public competitions. Swimmers were also required to take nude showers with soap prior to entering the pool, in order to eliminate contaminants and inspect swimmers to prohibit use by those with signs of disease. During women's weekly swim hours, simple one-piece suits were allowed and sometimes supplied by the facility to insure hygiene; towels were also supplied.

Compared to the general acceptance of boys being nude, an instance in 1947 where girls were given the same option lasted only six weeks in Highland Park, Michigan before a protest by mothers. However, only the middle school required suits, the elementary schools in the same district continued to allow girls to swim nude. The policy of male nudity continued officially until 1962 but was observed into the 1970s by the YMCA and schools with gender segregated classes.

The era of nude swimming by boys in indoor pools declined as mixed-gender usage was allowed, and then mandated by Title IX of the Education Amendments of 1972. Eventually all pool use became mixed-gender, and in the 21st century, the practice of male nude swimming is largely forgotten, or denied to have ever existed.

Child development

A report issued in 2009 on child sexual development in the United States by the National Child Traumatic Stress Network asserted that children have a natural curiosity about their own bodies and the bodies of others. The report recommended that parents learn what is normal in regard to nudity and sexuality at each stage of a child's development and refrain from overreacting to their children's nudity-related behaviors unless there are signs of a problem (e.g. anxiety, aggression, or sexual interactions between children not of the same age or stage of development). The general advice for caregivers is to find ways of setting boundaries without giving the child a sense of shame. Parents and caregivers need to understand that a child's explorations of their own and others bodies are motivated by curiosity, not anything similar to adult sexuality.

In Northern European countries, family nudity is normal, which teaches from an early age that nakedness need not be sexual. Bodily modesty is not part of the Finnish identity due to the universal use of the sauna, a historical tradition that has been maintained.

A 2009 report issued by the CDC comparing the sexual health of teens in France, Germany, the Netherlands and the United States concluded that if the US implemented comprehensive sex education similar to the three European countries there would be a significant reduction in teen pregnancies, abortions and the rate of sexually transmitted diseases, and save hundreds of millions of dollars.

Private versus public
In everyday usage, “public space” includes places that are not homes or places of work. The characteristics that define public include the space; if it is open to all as with parks, sidewalks, roads; or limited to paying customers as with cafés or supermarkets. Each kind of space has its own rules and norms that naturalize notions of what public is and does, and who counts as “the public”.

In thinking about nudity, an important dimension of culture is private-public and the behavior that is normal in each domain:
 In some cultures private means being entirely alone, defining personal space. In other cultures, privacy includes family and selected others; intimate space.
 Semi-private includes people less well known, but familiar, defining social space.
 Semi-public includes unknown others, but in a familiar setting with expectations of shared norms being followed. 
 Being in public includes potentially anyone. The meaning of public space changed as cities grew.

In the absence of visual barriers to being seen without clothes, privacy is maintained by social distance, as when being examined for medical purposes or receiving a massage. Violation of boundaries between doctors and patients is a serious breach of medical ethics. Between social equals, privacy is maintained by civil inattention, allowing others to maintain their personal space by only glancing, not looking directly, as in a crowded elevator. Civil inattention also maintains the non-sexual nature of semi-public situations in which relative or complete nakedness is necessary, such as communal bathing or changing clothes. Such activities are regulated by participants negotiating behaviors that avoid sexualization. A particular example is open water swimming in the United Kingdom, which by necessity means changing outdoors in mixed gender groups with minimal or no privacy. As a participant stated, "Open water swimming and nudity go hand in hand...People don't necessarily talk about it, but just know if you join a swimming club it's likely you will see far more genitalia than you were perhaps expecting." In the 21st century, many situations have become sexualized by media portrayals of any nudity as a prelude to sex.

Concepts of privacy 
Societies in continental Europe conceive of privacy as protecting a right to respect and personal dignity. Europeans maintain their dignity, even naked where others may see them, including sunbathing in urban parks. In Amsterdam, people are not shy about being naked in their homes, and do not use shades to prevent being seen from outside. In America, the right to privacy is oriented toward values of liberty, especially in one's home. Americans see nakedness where others may see as surrendering "any reasonable expectation of privacy". Such cultural differences may make some laws and behaviors of other societies seem incomprehensible, since each culture assumes that their own concepts of privacy are intuitive, and thus human universals.

High and low context cultures 

High and low context cultures were defined by anthropologist Edward T. Hall. The behaviors and norms of a high context culture depend upon shared implicit norms that operate within a social situation, while in a low context culture behavior is more dependent upon explicit communications. An example of this distinction was found in research on the behavior of French and German naturists on a nude beach. Germans, who are extremely low in cultural context, maintain public propriety on a nude beach by not wearing adornments, avoiding touching themselves and others, and any other behaviors that would call attention to the body. By contrast, the French, in their personal lives, are relatively high context: they interact within closely knit groups, they are sensitive to nonverbal cues, and they engage in relatively high amounts of body contact. French naturists were more likely than Germans to wear make-up and jewelry and to touch others as they would while dressed.

Private nudity
In the early 20th century, the attitudes of the general public toward the human body reflected rising consumerism, concerns regarding health and fitness, and changes in clothing fashions that sexualized the body. However, members of English families report that in the 1920s to 1940s they never saw other family members undressed, including those of the same gender. Modesty continued to prevail between married couples, even during sex. In the United States, a third of women born before 1900 remained clothed during sex, while it was only eight percent for those born in the 1920s. 

Individuals vary regarding being comfortable nude in situations that are private. According to a 2004 U.S. survey by ABC News, 31% of men and 14% of women report sleeping in the nude. In a 2014 survey in the U.K., 42% responded that they felt comfortable naked and 50% responded they did not. Only 22% said they often walk around the house naked, 29% slept in the nude, and 27% had gone swimming nude. In a 2018 U.S. survey by USA Today, 58% reported that they slept in the nude; by generation 65% of millennials, but only 39% of baby boomers.

Body image and shame
Body image is the perceptions and feelings of a person regarding their own body's appearance, which effects self-esteem and life satisfaction. There is evidence that the majority of women and girls in western societies have a negative body image, mainly regarding their size and weight. The sociocultural model of body image emphasizes the role of cultural ideals in the formation of an individual's body image. American ideals for women are unrealistic based upon a comparison of a healthy body mass index (BMI) with the desired BMI, which is 15% lower. Cultural ideals are transmitted by parents, peers, and the media. Men and boys are increasingly concerned with their appearance, wanting to be more muscular.

In non-western cultures, body image has a different meaning, particularly in sociocentric societies in which people think of themselves as part of a group, not as individuals. In addition, where food insecurity and disease is a danger, a person growing thinner is viewed as unhealthy; a more robust body is the ideal. The evolutionary perspective is that for women, hip-to-waist ratio with emphasis on the hips and a more curvaceous body is the ideal around the world, while for men it is waist-to-chest ratio. However, westernization of cultures has resulted in an increase in body dissatisfaction worldwide.

Shame is one of the moral emotions often associated with nudity. Shame may be thought of as positive in response to a failure to act in accordance with moral values, thus motivating improvement in the future. However, shame is often negative as the response to perceived failures to live up to unrealistic expectations. The shame regarding nudity is one of the classic examples of the emotion, yet rather than being a positive motivator, it is considered unhealthy. The universality of bodily shame is not supported by anthropological studies, which do not find the use of clothing to cover the genital areas in all societies, but instead the use of adornments to call attention to the sexuality of the body.

Others argue that the shame felt when naked in public is due to valuing modesty and privacy as socially positive. However, the response to public exposure of normally private behavior is embarrassment, rather than shame. The absence of shame, or any other negative emotions regarding being naked, depends upon becoming unselfconscious while nude, which is the state both of children and those that practice naturism. This state is more difficult for women given the social presumption that women's bodies are always being observed and judged not only by men but other women. In a naturist environment, because everyone is naked, it becomes possible to dilute the power of social judgements and experience freedom.

Naturists have long promoted the benefits of social nudity, but little research had been done, reflecting the generally negative assumptions surrounding public nudity. Recent studies indicate not only that social nudity promotes a positive body image, but that nudity-based interventions are helpful for those with a negative body image. A negative body image affects overall self-esteem, which in turn reduces life satisfaction. Psychologist Keon West of Goldsmiths, University of London found that nude social interaction reduced body anxiety and promoted well-being.

Semi-public nudity
Historically, certain facilities associated with activities that require partial or complete nakedness, such as bathing or changing clothes, have limited access to certain members of the public. These normal activities are guided by generally accepted norms, the first of which is that the facilities are most often segregated by gender; however, this may not be the case in all cultures. Discomfort with nudity has two components, not wanting to see others naked, and not wanting to be seen by others while naked. 

In Islamic countries, women may not use public baths, and men must wear a waist wrapper. In some traditional cultures and rural areas modern practices are limited by the belief that only the exposed parts of the body (hands, feet, face) need to be washed daily; and also by Christian and Muslim belief that the naked body is shameful and must always be covered.

Steam baths and spas

Many cultures have a tradition going back to prehistory of communal use of hot water or steam/sweat baths which are usually nude, sometimes with mixed genders. 
 
The sauna is attended nude in its source country of Finland, where many families have one in their home, and is one of the defining characteristics of Finnish identity. For Finns, going to a sauna is a ritual with cultural meanings regrading cleanliness, connections to nature, and connection to other people without public roles or sexuality. Saunas have been adopted worldwide, first in Scandinavian and German-speaking countries of Europe, with the trend in some of these being to allow both genders to bathe together nude. For example, the Friedrichsbad in Baden-Baden has designated times when mixed nude bathing is permitted. The German sauna culture also became popular in neighbouring countries such as Switzerland, Belgium, the Netherlands and Luxembourg. In contrast to Scandinavia, public sauna facilities in these countries—while nude—do not usually segregate genders. The sauna came to the United States in the 19th century when Finns settled in western territories, building family saunas on their farms. When community saunas were built in the 20th century, they eventually include separate steam rooms for men and women.

In Japan, public baths (Sentō) were once common, but became less so with the addition of bathtubs in homes. Sentō were mixed gender (konyoku) until the arrival of Western influences, but became segregated by gender in cities. Nudity is required at Japanese hot spring resorts (Onsen). Some resorts continue to be mixed gender, but the number is declining as they cease to be supported by local communities.

In Korea, bathhouses are known as Jjimjilbang. Such facilities may include mixed-sex sauna areas where clothing is worn, but bathing areas are gender segregated; nudity is required in those areas. Korean spas have opened in the United States, also gender separated except the bathing areas. In addition to the health benefits, a woman wrote in Psychology Today suggesting the social benefits for women and girls having real life experience of seeing the variety of real female bodies—even more naked than at a beach—as a counterbalance to the unrealistic nudity seen in popular media.

In Russia, communal banyas have been used for over a thousand years, serving both hygienic and social functions. Nudity and mixed sex usage was typical for much of this history.  Bathing facilities in homes threatened the existence of public banyas, but social functions maintained their popularity.

In Islamic countries, with many regional variations in practice, communal bathing at the hammam is primarily for men and avoids complete nudity.

Changing rooms and showers

The men's locker room—which in Western cultures had been a setting for open male social nudity—is, in the 21st century United States, becoming a space of modesty and distancing between men. For much of the 20th century, the norm in locker rooms had been for men to undress completely without embarrassment. That norm has changed; in the 21st century, men typically wear towels or other garments in the locker room most of the time and avoid any interaction with others while naked. This shift is the result of changes in social norms regarding masculinity and how maleness is publicly expressed; also, open male nudity has become associated with homosexuality. In facilities such as the YMCA that cater to multiple generations, the young are uncomfortable sharing space with older people who do not cover up. The behavior in women's locker rooms and showers also indicates a generational change, younger women covering more, and full nudity being brief and rare, while older women are more open and casual.

In the 21st century, some high-end New York City gyms were redesigned to cater to millennials who want to shower without ever being seen naked. The trend for privacy is being extended to public schools, colleges and community facilities replacing "gang showers" and open locker rooms with individual stalls and changing rooms. The change also addresses issues of transgender usage and family use when one parent accompanies children of differing gender.

Arts-related activities

Distinct from the nude artworks created, sessions where artists work from live models are a social situation where nudity has a long tradition. The role of the model both as part of visual art education and in the creation of finished works has evolved since antiquity in Western societies and worldwide wherever western cultural practices in the visual arts have been adopted. At modern universities, art schools, and community groups "art model" is a job, one requirement of which is to pose "undraped" and motionless for minutes, hours (with breaks) or resuming the same pose for days as the artwork requires. Some have investigated the benefits of arts education including nudes as an opportunity to satisfy youthful curiosity regarding the human body in a non-sexual context.

Public nudity

Participants in the counterculture of the 1960s embraced nudity as part of their daily routine and to emphasize their rejection of anything artificial. In the mainstream, Diana Vreeland could note in Vogue in 1970 that a bikini bottom worn alone had become fashionable for young women on beaches from Saint-Tropez to Sardinia. In 1974, an article in The New York Times noted an increase in American tolerance for nudity, both at home and in public, approaching that of Europe. By 1998, American attitudes toward sexuality had continued to become more liberal than in prior decades, but the reaction to total nudity in public was generally negative. However, some elements of the counterculture, including nudity, continued with events such as Burning Man.

Attitudes toward public nudity vary from complete prohibition in Islamic countries to general acceptance, particularly in Scandinavia and Germany, of nudity for recreation and at special events. Such special events can be understood by expanding the historical concept of Carnival, where otherwise transgressive behaviors are allowed on particular occasions to include public nudity. Examples include the Solstice Swim in Tasmania (part of the Dark Mofo festival) and World Naked Bike Rides.

Germany is known for being tolerant of public nudity in many situations. In a 2014 survey, 28% of Austrians and Germans had sunbathed nude on a beach, 18% of Norwegians, 17% of Spaniards and Australians, 16% of New Zealanders. Of the nationalities surveyed, the Japanese had the lowest percentage, 2%.

In the United States in 2012, the city council of San Francisco, California, banned public nudity in the inner-city area. This move was met by harsh resistance because the city was known for its liberal culture and had previously tolerated public nudity. Similarly, park rangers began issuing tickets against nudists at San Onofre State Beach—also a place with long tradition of public nudity—in 2010.

Naturism

Nudism, in German  (FKK), "free body culture" originated in Europe in the late 19th century among some members of the life reform movement (Lebensreform) who sought a simpler life in opposition to industrialization. While Christian moralists tended to condemn nudism, other Christians argued for the moral purity of the nude body compared to the corruption of the scanty clothing of the era. Its proponents believed that nudism could combat social inequality, including sexual inequality. Naturist attitudes toward the body became more widely accepted in sports and in the arts in the Weimar Republic. There were advocates of the health benefits of sun and fresh air that instituted programs of exercise in the nude for children in groups of mixed gender, Adolf Koch founding thirteen FKK schools. With the rise of Nazism in the 1930s, the nudism movement split ideologically, the socialists adopting the views of Koch, seeing his programs as part of improving the lives of the working class. Although many Nazis opposed nudity, others used it to extol the Aryan race as the standard of beauty, as reflected in the Nazi propaganda film Olympia directed by Leni Riefenstahl. Between the first and second world wars, naturism spread to other countries based upon the German model, but being less ideological and political; incorporating cultural elements within Scandinavia, France, England, Belgium and the Netherlands.

Contemporary naturism (or nudism) is a subculture advocating and defending private and public nudity as part of a simple, natural lifestyle. Naturists reject contemporary standards of modesty that discourage personal, family and social nudity. They instead seek to create a social environment where individuals feel comfortable being in the company of nude people and being seen nude, either by other naturists or by the general public. In contradiction of the popular belief that nudists are more sexually permissive, research finds that nudist and non-nudists do not differ in their sexual behavior. The young children with experiences of naturism or nudity in the home had a more positive body image.

The social sciences, until the middle of the 20th century, often studied public nakedness, including naturism, in the context of deviance or criminality. However, more recent studies find that naturism has positive effects on body image, self-esteem and life satisfaction.

Legal issues 

Worldwide, laws regarding clothing specify what parts of the body must be covered, prohibiting complete nudity in public except for those jurisdictions that allow nude recreation.

Specific laws may either require or prohibit religious attire (veiling) for women. In a survey using data from 2012 to 2013, there were 11 majority Muslim countries where women must cover their entire bodies in public, which may include the face. There were 39 countries, mostly in Europe, that had some prohibition of religious attire, in particular face coverings in certain situations, such as government buildings. Within Russia, laws may either require or prohibit veiling depending upon location.

The brief, sudden exposure of parts of the body normally hidden from public view has a long tradition, taking several forms.

 Flashing refers to the brief public exposure of the genitals or female breasts. At Mardi Gras in New Orleans flashing—an activity that would be prohibited at any other time and place—has become a ritual of long standing in celebration of Carnival. While many celebrations of Carnival worldwide include minimal costumes, the extent of nudity in the French Quarter is due to its long history as a "red light district". The ritual "disrobing" is done in the context of a performance which earns a payment, even though it is only symbolic (glass beads). Although the majority of those performing continue to be women, men (both homosexual and heterosexual) now also participate.
 Mooning refers to exposure of the buttocks. Mooning opponents in sports or in battle as an insult may have a history going back to ancient Rome.
 Streaking refers to running nude through a public area. While the activity may have a long history, the term originated in the 1970s for a fad on college campuses, which was initially widespread but short-lived. Later, a tradition of "nude runs" became institutionalized on certain campuses, such as the Primal Scream at Harvard.

In the United Kingdom, nudity may not be used to "harass, alarm or distress" according to the Public Order Act of 1986. According to a police spokesperson in 2013, nudity per se is not unlawful in the United Kingdom; however, the circumstances surrounding particular episodes of nudity may create public order offenses. Most naturists comply with the law by being nude only where others cannot see them. After repeated arrests, prosecutions, and convictions in Great Britain, the activist Stephen Gough sued at the European Court of Human Rights for the right to be nude in public outside of designated areas. His claim was ultimately rejected.

In the 21st century in the United States, the legal definition of "full nudity" is exposure of the genitals. "Partial nudity" includes exposure of the buttocks by either sex or exposure of the female breasts. Legal definitions are further complicated by laws regarding indecent exposure; this term generally refers to engaging in public nudity with an intent to offend common decency. Lewd and indecent behavior is usually defined as causing alarm, discomfort, or annoyance for the average person. Where the law has been challenged by asserting that nudity by itself in not lewd or disorderly, laws have been amended to specify indecent exposure, usually of the genitals but not always of the breast. Public indecency is generally a misdemeanor, but may become a felony upon repeated offense or always if done in the presence of a minor. The law differs between different states. In the state of Oregon, public nudity is legal and protected as free speech as long as there is not an "intent to arouse". The state of Arkansas not only outlaws private nudism, but bans anyone from advocating the practice.

Imposed nudity

Punishment
In some situations, nudity is forced on a person. For example, imposed nudity (full or partial) can be part of a corporal punishment or as humiliation, especially when administered in public. For example, in 2017, students at a girls' school in the north-east Indian state of Arunachal Pradesh were forced to undress as a form of punishment, police say. Although not as common as corporal punishment, it is not unusual for stripping to be used as a form of punishment in Indian schools.

Torture
Nazis used forced nudity to humiliate inmates in concentration camps. This practice was depicted in the film Schindler's List (1993).

In 2003, Abu Ghraib prison in Baghdad, Iraq gained international notoriety for accounts of torture and abuses by members of the United States Army Reserve during the post-invasion period. Photographic images were circulated that showed the posing of prisoners naked, sometimes bound, and being intimidated and otherwise humiliated, resulting in widespread condemnation of the abuse.

Strip search

A strip search is the removal of some or all of a person's clothing to ensure that they do not have weapons or contraband. Such searches are generally done when an individual is imprisoned after an arrest, and is justified by the need to maintain order in the facility, not as punishment for a crime.

Nudity as protest

Nudity is used to draw public attention to a cause, sometimes including the promotion of public nudity itself. In Africa from the colonial to the contemporary eras, women have used nudity to confront  economic and political injustices. Although similar in behavior, each incident may have different roots in the beliefs regarding female power within each society, in particular between West Africa and South Africa.

Particular issues represented include animal rights by the group PETA, environmental issues by the World Naked Bike Ride, and women's rights by the organization FEMEN.

Depictions and performance

In a picture-making civilization, pictorial conventions continually reaffirm what is natural in human appearance, which is part of socialization. In Western societies, the contexts for depictions of nudity include information, art and pornography. Any ambiguous image not easily fitting into one of these categories may be misinterpreted, leading to disputes. The nude in photography includes scientific, commercial, fine art, and erotic photography. China has never had a tradition of depicting the nude except in pornography. In 1925, nude models were banned from Chinese art schools. In Islam, any depictions of the body or sexuality, including photography and film, are forbidden as they would be in life.

The naked human body was one of the first subjects of prehistoric art, including the numerous female figurines found throughout Europe, the earliest now dating from 40,000 years ago. The meaning of these objects cannot be determined, however the exaggeration of breasts, bellies, and buttocks indicate more symbolic than realistic interpretations. Alternatives include symbolism of fertility, abundance, or overt sexuality in the context of beliefs in supernatural forces.

Depictions of child nudity (or of children with nude adults) appear in works of art in various cultures and historical periods. These attitudes have changed over time and have become increasingly frowned upon, especially in the case of photography. During the years when film was developed by commercial photo labs, snapshots taken by parents of their nude infant or toddler children were reported to the police as possible child pornography. While some individuals were arrested, tried, or convicted; no charges involving mere nudity have been ultimately upheld, because the legal definition of child pornography is that it depicts sexually explicit conduct.

Live performances, such as dance, theater, and performance art may include nudity either for realism or symbolic meaning. Nudity on stage has become generally accepted in Western cultures beginning in the 20th century. In Islamic countries any erotic or sexually exciting performances, such as dancing, are forbidden. Contemporary choreographers consider nudity one of the possible "costumes" available for dance, some seeing nudity as expressing deeper human qualities through dance which works against the sexual objectification of the body in commercial culture.

In the United States, nudity in live performance is a matter of local laws except for First Amendment protection of free expression, which is generally recognized with regard to performances in an artistic context. In other contexts, nudity is limited by a 1991 US Supreme Court decision in Barnes v. Glen Theatre, Inc. which upheld an Indiana law prohibiting total nudity for dancers in a bar.

See also

Human skin
Nudity in combat
Nude recreation
Anarcho-naturism
List of places where social nudity is practised
List of social nudity organizations
Modesty
History of nude art

References

Notes

Citations

Works cited

Books

Journal articles

News

Websites

 
Human evolution
Culture
Social sciences
Precolonial history